The Marine Corps Combat Utility Uniform (MCCUU) is the current battledress uniform of the United States Marine Corps. It is also worn by Navy personnel (mostly corpsmen, Seabees, chaplains, and  their bodyguards) assigned to Marine Corps units (e.g. the Fleet Marine Force).

It replaced the Battle Dress Uniform, which the Marine Corps had shared with the Navy, Army and Air Force. However, both the MCCUU, and its distinctive camouflage pattern, MARPAT, are exclusive to the Marine Corps, which holds the patents to their design. The uniform is available in two color schemes, woodland and desert. The MCCUU should not be confused with the similar looking FROG uniform.

Development

Field testing of the MCCUU began in early 2001 and was officially announced to the public in June 2001. Early prototypes had featured removable sleeves, but that design feature was later abandoned. The patent for the MARPAT pattern was filed on June 19, 2001, whereas the patent for the MCCUU uniform was filed on November 7, 2001. The uniform made its official debut at Camp Lejeune, North Carolina on January 17, 2002, and the changeover was completed on October 1, 2004 (with a few exceptions of April 1, 2005), a year ahead of the original deadline date set in 2001 of October 1, 2005.

The early prototypes of the MCCUU were designed by Propper International and American Power Source.

Design features

The MCCUU is intended for wear in the field or for working parties, but has become the typical working uniform for all deployed and most garrison U.S. Marines and U.S. Navy sailors. Initially the variety worn depended on the environment and season: Deployed Marines wore whichever color is more appropriate to the climate and terrain, Marines in garrison wore the woodland MCCUU in winter months, and the desert MCCUU in summer months. However, the Marine Corps announced on December 8, 2016 that the desert pattern would no longer be worn in garrison. Instead, the woodland MCCUU will be worn year-round, with the sleeves rolled up during the summer and down during the winter. Until recently, the sleeves of the blouse were normally worn rolled up while in garrison during summer months. However, the Uniform Board announced that as of October 24, 2011, this will no longer be allowed. This decision was later reversed when Marine Corps Commandant General James Amos announced on February 25, 2014, that the Marine Corps will return to its former standard of rolling up the sleeves while in garrison during summer months, effective March 9, 2014.

Unlike the previous BDU, the MCCUU was designed to be used with body armor, which previously restricted access to front pockets. To further distinguish the uniform, upon close examination, the Eagle, Globe, and Anchor can be found within the pattern. Its use as a combat uniform has led to some strict regulations for wear in garrison: unlike the U.S. Army's Army Combat Uniform (ACU), the MCCUU may not be worn off base, although it may be worn when commuting to and from duty in a privately-owned vehicle. Dismounting for incidental stops en route off of a military installation is no longer permissible excepting legitimate emergencies only.

Blouse
 Two slanting chest pockets with velcro closure
 Two shoulder sleeve pockets with button closure
 Reinforced elbows
 Internal pockets for elbow pads
 Adjustable cuffs
 Eagle, Globe, and Anchor embroidered on the left chest pocket

Trousers
 Two front slash style pockets
 Two rear pockets with button closure
 Two thigh level bellows cargo pockets with elastic closure
 Button fly
 Reinforced knees and seat
 Partially elastic waistband
 Internal pockets for kneepads
 Seven belt loops

The trousers are worn bloused over the tops of the boots with the use of elastic bands (nicknamed "boot bands") or metal springs.

Headwear
 In garrison the 8 point cover is worn
 In the field, the boonie (floppy) cover can be worn, not authorized for garrison wear.
 The Marine Corps Lightweight Helmet and MICH is worn in combat and training with a reversible MARPAT cover
 The Marine Corps Eagle, Globe, and Anchor is embroidered on both the boonie and utility covers.

T-shirt
An olive drab green t-shirt, or skivvy shirt, without a logo is worn underneath the blouse. Due to the intense heat in Iraq, moisture wicking t-shirts, such as those produced by Under Armour became very popular. However, due to concerns that the shirts would melt to the skin in the event of a fire or explosion, they are banned when a Marine is deployed to a combat zone. However, the Marine Corps has worked with Danskin to develop their own moisture wicking shirts under the "Elite Issue" line, ultimately creating and issuing the Flame Resistant Organizational Gear to troops likely to be exposed to combat.

Belt
The MCCUU is worn with a webbed rigger's belt earned through the Marine Corps Martial Arts Program. The belts are tan, grey, green, brown, or up to six degrees of black, depending on the Marine's proficiency. Uniform regulations still authorize a web belt for wear for Marines that have not qualified in MCMAP; however, the Commandant of the Marine Corps directed in 2008 that all Marines will qualify. This directive rendered the wear of the item on the MCCUU to new recruits in basic training or to those who have lost their MCMAP belt due to not being proficient in the MCMAP.

Boots
The Marine Corps now requires tan rough-out combat boots, either hot weather or temperate weather versions. Commercial versions of this boot are authorized without limitation other than they must be at least 8 inches in height and bear the Eagle, Globe, and Anchor on the outer heel of each boot. Stains and damage to the boot make them unserviceable for wear, as well as a heel with excessive wear.

When the MCCUU was first being fielded in 2002, the black leather boots that were worn with the woodland BDU were authorized to be worn with the woodland MCCUU in the absence of the tan suede ones, though now, only the latter are authorized.

Insignia
Rank insignia is pinned onto the collar:
 Marines from pay-grades E-1 to E-9 wear black insignia.
 Marine officers wear polished insignia in garrison, subdued (flat black and brown to replace silver and gold, respectively) or none in the field.

Most badges and breast insignia are authorized for wear on the utility uniform, shined or subdued as appropriate. Landing Support Marines also wear the Red Patch insignia.

MARPAT patterns

See also

 Uniforms of the United States Military
 Uniforms of the United States Marine Corps
 MARPAT
 Flame Resistant Organizational Gear
 Airman Battle Uniform
 Army Combat Uniform
 Battle Dress Uniform
 Navy Working Uniform
 Operational Camouflage Pattern
 Operational Dress Uniform

Notes

External links
 Permanent Marine Corps Uniform Board
 Marine Uniform Regulations
 How to Properly Align Rank Insignia on Marine Uniforms wikiHow
 
 
 

2001 in military history
2001 clothing
United States military uniforms
United States Marine Corps equipment
Military equipment introduced in the 2000s